Mercedes Justine Kaestner-Varnado (born January 26, 1992) is an American professional wrestler and actress. She is currently signed to  New Japan Pro-Wrestling (NJPW) under the ring name Mercedes Moné, where she is the current IWGP Women's Champion in her first reign. Varnado also appears in NJPW's sister promotion World Wonder Ring Stardom. She is best known for her time in WWE from 2012 to 2022, where she performed under the ring name Sasha Banks.

Varnado began her wrestling career in 2010 on the independent circuit, most notably for Chaotic Wrestling, where she won the Chaotic Wrestling Women's Championship. She signed with WWE in 2012 under the ring name Sasha Banks and was assigned to the developmental territory NXT. She would later win the NXT Women's Championship. Her match against Bayley at NXT TakeOver: Respect in October 2015 was the first women's match to ever headline an NXT TakeOver, the first iron woman match in WWE history, and the longest women's match in WWE history at the time with a length of 30 minutes. Their match was voted by Pro Wrestling Illustrated (PWI) as Match of the Year, with Varnado also being voted as Woman of the Year.

In 2015, Varnado was promoted to WWE's main roster, where she went on to hold the Raw Women's Championship five times. In 2016, she and Charlotte Flair became the first women to headline a WWE pay-per-view event, the first women to compete in a Hell in a Cell match, and the first women to win the PWI award for Feud of the Year. In 2019, she won the inaugural WWE Women's Tag Team Championship with tag team partner, Bayley, at the Elimination Chamber pay-per-view. In 2020, she won the SmackDown Women's Championship at the Hell in a Cell pay-per-view, thus becoming the third-ever WWE Women's Grand Slam Champion and the fourth WWE Women's Triple Crown Champion. That year, she was named Wrestler of the Year by Sports Illustrated. At WrestleMania 37, Varnado and opponent Bianca Belair became the first two African Americans to jointly headline a WrestleMania, WWE's flagship event. She was the third most tweeted about female athlete in 2021. After creative issues in 2022, Varnado walked out of WWE and was unable to negotiate a new contract. She then made her debut for NJPW/Stardom at Wrestle Kingdom 17 in January 2023 under the ring name Mercedes Moné.

Outside of wrestling, Varnado began an acting career in 2020. Her debut role was the character Koska Reeves in the second season of the Disney+ series The Mandalorian.

Early life 
Mercedes Justine Kaestner-Varnado was born in Fairfield, California, on January 26, 1992, the daughter of Reo and Judith Varnado. Her mother is of German descent, while her father was African-American. Her family moved to various places, including Minnesota, to find schools and hospitals for her autistic brother Joshua. They settled in Boston, where she began her professional wrestling career. She went to school online and grew up watching All Japan Women's Pro-Wrestling (AJW).

Professional wrestling career

Early career (2010–2012) 

Kaestner-Varnado began training at Chaotic Wrestling (CW), based in Woburn, Massachusetts, in 2008. Working under the ring name Mercedes KV, she would win the Women's title when she defeated Alexxis in a "I Quit" match. She held the title for 259 days, vacating the belt after she signed a contract with WWE. Between 2010 and 2012, she also worked for New England Championship Wrestling (NECW) or National Wrestling Alliance (NWA).

WWE (2012–2022)

The BFFs (2012–2014) 
In June 2012, Kaestner-Varnado participated in a WWE tryout camp and on August 18, it was announced that she had been signed to a contract. She was assigned to NXT, WWE's developmental territory, where she adopted the ring name Sasha Banks, and made her televised debut on NXT on December 12, losing to Paige. Banks then entered a storyline where she received letters from a secret admirer, who was eventually revealed to be Audrey Marie, who returned and attacked Banks on the February 20 episode of NXT, due to Marie's jealousy of Banks' success. Marie went on to defeat Banks in a match later that episode. Banks' feud with Marie came to an end on the April 3 episode of NXT, when Banks teamed with Paige to defeat Marie and Summer Rae. On the June 19 episode of NXT, Banks competed in the NXT Women's Championship tournament to determine the inaugural champion, but lost to Rae in the first round.

After weeks of influence by Summer Rae to make herself relevant, Banks was defeated by the NXT Women's Champion Paige on the September 11 episode of NXT, after which she attacked Paige after the latter attempted to console her, leading to Banks turn into a villainess. Two weeks later on NXT, Banks defeated Bayley, while accompanied by Rae. After the match, Banks cut a promo with Rae and debuted a new gimmick as "The Boss". Banks and Rae, who dubbed themselves The Beautiful, Fierce Females (BFFs), faced Paige and Emma on the October 16 episode of NXT, where they emerged victorious. On the November 13 episode of NXT, the BFFs defeated Bayley and Charlotte in a tag team match, when Charlotte attacked Bayley and aligned herself with Banks and Rae. In mid-January 2014, as Rae moved up to WWE's main roster, Banks and Charlotte began a rivalry with Bayley, who had aligned herself with Natalya, and lost in both singles and tag team matches. On April 6, Banks made an appearance at WrestleMania XXX as a part of Triple H's entrance. In May, Banks entered a tournament for the vacant NXT Women's Championship, defeating Bayley in the first round, but losing to Natalya in the semi-finals. On the July 3 episode of NXT, Banks and Charlotte defeated Bayley and Becky Lynch, only for Charlotte to leave Banks after the match to get attacked by Bayley, with Banks officially disbanding the BFFs in a backstage segment later that night.

NXT Women's Champion (2014–2015) 

On the August 14 episode of NXT, Banks lost to Bayley in a match to determine the number one contender to the NXT Women's Championship. At NXT TakeOver: Fatal 4-Way on September 11, Banks attacked Bayley after her title match with Charlotte, before Charlotte stopped her. Becky Lynch turned on Bayley and aligned herself with Banks on the October 23 episode of NXT after Banks defeated Bayley in a singles match. Banks promptly began feuding with NXT Women's Champion Charlotte, leading to a match between the two at NXT TakeOver: R Evolution on December 11 with Charlotte's championship on the line, which Banks lost. Banks received a rematch on the December 25 episode of NXT, where she was once again unsuccessful. Banks first appeared on WWE's main roster on the December 30, 2014, episode of Main Event, where she lost to Charlotte in a non-title match. On January 21, 2015, Banks received another title match against Charlotte, which she lost after Becky Lynch attacked Charlotte, causing a disqualification, which led to dissension between Banks and Lynch.

On February 11, 2015, at NXT TakeOver: Rival, Banks won the NXT Women's Championship by pinning Charlotte in a fatal four-way match that also involved Lynch and Bayley. Banks successfully retained the championship against Charlotte twice, Alexa Bliss, and Becky Lynch.

At NXT TakeOver: Brooklyn on August 22, Banks dropped the NXT Women's Championship to Bayley, thus ending her reign at 192 days. The match was highly praised by critics and won Match of the Year at the NXT Year-End Awards. At NXT TakeOver: Respect on October 7, Banks was defeated by Bayley in the main event in the first women's 30-minute Iron man match in WWE history, losing two falls to three in what would be her last match in NXT.

Team B.A.D. (2015–2016) 

Banks made her official debut on the July 13, 2015, episode of Raw along with Charlotte and Becky Lynch, after Stephanie McMahon called for a "revolution" in the WWE Divas division. While Lynch and Charlotte allied with Paige, who was feuding with Team Bella (Alicia Fox, Brie and Nikki Bella), Banks allied with Naomi and Tamina, who later dubbed themselves as Team B.A.D. (Beautiful and Dangerous), leading to a brawl between the three teams. In her WWE pay-per-view debut on July 19 at Battleground, Banks competed in a triple threat match against Charlotte and Brie Bella, which Charlotte won. Banks went on to defeat Paige twice, first by submission on the July 20 episode of Raw, in a tag team match where Banks teamed with Naomi for the first time, and again on the July 27 episode of Raw in a singles match. After defeating the Divas Champion Nikki Bella by submission in a non-title match on the August 17 episode of Raw, Banks participated in the first-ever Divas number one contender's Beat the Clock challenge match, in which she fought Paige to a time limit draw and Charlotte was named the number one contender. Following this, Banks rekindled her rivalry with Paige and defeated her twice on the September 7 and 14 episodes of Raw. Although she lost in a fatal four-way number one contender's match for Charlotte's Divas Championship in November, Banks was not pinned and began a winning streak, defeating the likes of Brie Bella, Alicia Fox, and Becky Lynch on various shows.

After a month off television, Banks returned at the Royal Rumble pay-per-view on January 24, 2016, attacking Charlotte and Becky Lynch after their championship match, showing her intentions to gain the Divas Championship. Prior to a match with Lynch on the February 1 episode of Raw, Banks claimed that she was "on her own", signaling that she had moved on from Team B.A.D., only to be attacked by Naomi and Tamina during the match, turning Banks into a fan favorite in the process. The feud between Banks and Naomi and Tamina continued throughout February, and led to a tag team match at Fastlane on February 21, where Banks allied with Lynch to defeat the two. Banks and Lynch went on to compete in two matches to determine the number one contender for Charlotte's Divas Championship at WrestleMania 32, with the first bout ending in a draw after a double pin occurred as both of their shoulders were down for the count, and the second in a no contest after both Banks and Lynch were attacked by Charlotte. As a result, a triple threat match between Banks, Lynch and Charlotte for the Divas Championship was announced for WrestleMania. At the event on April 3, the Divas Championship was retired and replaced with the new WWE Women's Championship, with all three women competing for it in the triple threat match; Banks was unsuccessful in capturing the new title at her WrestleMania in-ring debut.

Raw Women's Champion (2016–2017) 
After a hiatus, Banks returned to WWE television in early June, and later reignited her feud with Charlotte over the WWE Women's Championship after an attack along with Paige on the June 20 episode of Raw. This led to a tag team match the following week, on the June 27 episode of Raw, where Banks and Paige scored the victory. Following multiple attacks and matches between Banks and Dana Brooke, Banks and her mystery partner Bayley defeated Brooke and Charlotte in a tag team match on July 24 at Battleground.

After being drafted to the Raw brand as part of the 2016 WWE draft on July 19, 2016, Banks made her first appearance for the brand on July 25, where she defeated Charlotte to win the WWE Women's Championship for the first time. On August 21 at SummerSlam, Banks dropped the championship back to Charlotte, ending her reign at 27 days. Around that time, the title was renamed the Raw Women's Championship following the creation of the SmackDown Women's Championship. On September 25, Charlotte successfully retained the championship against Banks and Bayley in a triple threat match at Clash of Champions. Banks was granted a one-on-one rematch on the October 3 episode of Raw, where she defeated Charlotte in the main event to capture her second Raw Women's Championship. Banks challenged Charlotte to compete for the championship in the first ever women's Hell in a Cell match at the titular Hell in a Cell pay-per-view event on October 30, which was then announced as the main event, making it the first time women had received the last match of a pay-per-view card in WWE. At the event, Charlotte defeated Banks, again ending her reign at 27 days. A few weeks later, on November 20, Banks was part of Raw's women's team for Survivor Series, during which she was eliminated by Natalya, but Team Raw was ultimately victorious. On the November 28 episode of Raw, after invoking her rematch clause a week prior, Banks defeated Charlotte in a falls count anywhere match to win the Raw Women's Championship for the record-tying third time. A 30-minute iron man match between the two took place at Roadblock: End of the Line on December 18, which resulted in a 2–2 draw, but Banks lost to Flair 3–2 in sudden death overtime. With the loss, the feud between the two ended, since it was stipulated that Banks could not invoke her rematch clause if she lost. On the February 13 episode of Raw, Banks helped Bayley defeat Flair to win the Raw Women's Championship. At WrestleMania 33, Banks participated in a fatal four-way elimination match for the title, where Bayley retained the championship.

Months later, Banks faced Alexa Bliss for the Raw Women's Championship. Bliss retained the title at Great Balls of Fire, but Banks won it at SummerSlam. Eight days later, Banks dropped the title back to Bliss on Raw. At No Mercy on September 24, Banks received her rematch for the title as she took part in a fatal five-way match which was won by Bliss.

The Boss 'n' Hug Connection (2017–2019) 

In December, Banks competed in the first-ever women's match contested in Abu Dhabi against Alexa Bliss. In 2018, Banks participated in the first Women's Royal Rumble match, where she lasted 54:46, and the first women's Elimination Chamber match.

On the March 26 episode of Raw, after weeks of animosity between the two, including Bayley betraying Banks during their matches, they brawled backstage and had to be separated. Banks and Bayley faced off in mid-April but their match ended in a no-contest after The Riott Squad (Ruby Riott, Sarah Logan, and Liv Morgan) interfered and attacked them both. In the following weeks, Banks competed in different singles and tag team matches in both winning and losing efforts. In June, after she defeated Ruby Riott in the finals of a gauntlet match for the last spot, Banks competed in a Money in the Bank ladder match for the first time in her career, that was ultimately won by Alexa Bliss. Throughout mid-2018, after Banks and Bayley continued to attack each other, they were told to attend counsellor meetings to help maintain their friendship. In July, the two reconciled and created a tag team, known as "The Boss 'n' Hug Connection".

After a short hiatus from the ring due to an undisclosed injury, Banks returned to WWE television in October, and took part in the first-ever all women's pay-per-view Evolution, where she teamed with Bayley and Natalya in a winning effort against The Riott Squad. In November, Banks again competed at Survivor Series as part of Team Raw, where she was the last woman from the team that was eliminated by Asuka after an attack by teammate Nia Jax. On January 27, 2019, at the Royal Rumble, after she defeated Nia Jax to earn herself a title match, Banks unsuccessfully challenged Ronda Rousey for the Raw Women's Championship. During the match with Rousey, Banks suffered a separated shoulder.

On February 17, at the Elimination Chamber, Banks and Bayley won the inaugural WWE Women's Tag Team Championship by lastly eliminating Mandy Rose and Sonya Deville in a six tag team Elimination Chamber match. In their first title defense, Banks and Bayley successfully retained over Nia Jax and Tamina, at Fastlane, on March 10. At WrestleMania 35 on April 7, Banks and Bayley lost the championship to The IIconics (Billie Kay and Peyton Royce) in a fatal four-way tag team match, ending their reign at 49 days.

Hiatus and renewed alliance with Bayley (2019–2020) 

The following day, Banks cancelled an appearance on the morning talk show Wendy at the last minute. Throughout the following week, speculation from dirt sheets emerged that she was looking to quit the company due to her longstanding frustrations with WWE. Banks held the impression that she and Bayley were going to have a long title reign to bring credibility to the WWE Women's Tag Team Championship, with the two allegedly not being informed until the last minute that they would be dropping the titles at WrestleMania. Her talk show cancellation was reported to be due to a personal matter. As she'd been dealing with depression, she asked Vince McMahon for her release. While McMahon denied her request, he granted Banks time off to reconsider her career.

After a four-month hiatus, Banks returned and was pared with Bayley, both as heels. Upon her return, Banks reignited her feud with Raw Women's Champion Becky Lynch, leading to a Raw Women's Championship match at Clash of Champions. At the event, Banks took a win via disqualification, however, Lynch retained. Their feud eventually led to the second ever women's Hell in a Cell match at the titular event, in which Banks was unsuccessful in winning the title. After she was drafted to the SmackDown brand as part of the 2019 draft, she then went on another brief hiatus from TV due to injuring her tailbone. When she returned, she was named captain of the SmackDown women's team, leading into Survivor Series. At the pay-per-view, Banks was the last woman standing for the SmackDown brand in the Women's Survivor Series match, but was pinned by Rhea Ripley from Team NXT, who won the match. At WrestleMania 36, she participated in a fatal five-way elimination match for Bayley's SmackDown Women's Championship, where the champion retained.

SmackDown Women's Champion (2020–2021) 
After WrestleMania 36, Banks and Bayley would begin teasing a potential feud between the two, with the emphasis being put on the narrative that Banks is the reason for Bayley's success and that Bayley is responsible for most of Banks' losing efforts. Despite their brewing dispute, Banks and Bayley reclaimed the WWE Women's Tag Team Championship on the June 5 episode of SmackDown by defeating Alexa Bliss and Nikki Cross. During the reign, Banks and Bayley began feuding with Raw Women's Champion Asuka, leading to a Raw Women's Championship match between Banks and Asuka at The Horror Show at Extreme Rules, which ended in a controversial finish. A rematch took place eight days later on Raw, where Banks defeated Asuka to win the Raw Women's Championship for a record-setting fifth time. With the win, Banks and Bayley became the first female tag team—and the fifth overall—in history to hold singles and tag team titles simultaneously. Throughout August, Asuka and Banks continued their feud, which culminated in a title match at SummerSlam on August 23, where Banks dropped the Raw Women's Championship back to Asuka. A week later at Payback, Banks and Bayley dropped the WWE Women's Tag Team Championship to Nia Jax and Shayna Baszler.

On the September 4 episode of SmackDown, after losing a rematch to Jax and Baszler, Bayley turned on Banks by brutally attacking her in the ring, thereby turning the latter face in the process and disbanding their team. The feud between the two eventually culminated in a Hell in a Cell match at the eponymous pay-per-view, where Banks submitted Bayley to win the SmackDown Women's Championship for the first time in her career. With the win, Banks became the third Women's Grand Slam and fourth Triple Crown Champion. On the November 6 episode of SmackDown, Banks defeated Bayley in a SmackDown Women's Championship rematch to retain the title, thus ending her drought of unsuccessful defenses with a main roster singles title. At the TLC: Tables, Ladders & Chairs event on December 20, Banks defeated Carmella by submission to retain the SmackDown Women's Championship.

At the Royal Rumble pay-per-view on January 31, Banks defeated Carmella in a rematch from TLC to retain the SmackDown Women's Championship. Later on in the night, Bianca Belair would go on to win the women's Royal Rumble match, thereby granting her an opportunity to challenge for a women's championship of her choice at WrestleMania 37. In the weeks to follow, Banks and Belair would proceed to build up to the reveal of Belair's opponent of choice on SmackDown, up until the February 26 episode of the aforementioned show, when Belair officially chose to face Banks for the SmackDown Women's Championship at the event. Over the following month, the two would team up to challenge Nia Jax and Shayna Baszler for the WWE Women's Tag Team Championship at the Elimination Chamber and Fastlane pay-per-view events, but were unsuccessful. On April 9, WWE announced that the bout between Banks and Belair would main event Night 1 of WrestleMania 37, thus marking the first time in the company's history that two African-American women will have faced each other in a marquee match. Furthermore, the two were the first African-American wrestlers in WrestleMania history to have faced each other in the main event of the show. At the event, Banks dropped the SmackDown Women's Championship to Belair, ending her reign at 167 days.

After Banks' return in July, she was booked to faced Bianca Belair for the SmackDown Women's Championship at SummerSlam, but Banks was pulled from the event. She had the title match at Crown Jewel on October 21, but as a triple threat match also involving new champion Becky Lynch, where Banks was unsuccessful at regaining the title. At Survivor Series in November, Banks was captain of the SmackDown women's team, where she was eliminated via countout following interference from her teammates.

Partnership with Naomi and departure (2022) 
On January 2, 2022, Banks sustained a calcaneus injury during a house show match against Charlotte Flair. She would make her return on the January 28 episode of SmackDown, where she declared for the women's Royal Rumble match. At the namesake event, Banks entered first, eliminating Melina and Kelly Kelly before being eliminated by Queen Zelina. On the February 25 episode of SmackDown, Naomi announced that she and Banks were going to challenge for the WWE Women's Tag Team Championship. At Night 2 of WrestleMania 38, Banks and Naomi won the WWE Women's Tag Team Championship for the first time as a team, the first time for Naomi, and a record-tying third time for Banks.

Banks and Naomi's title defense on the May 13 episode of SmackDown would be their final televised WWE appearance, and their match at a WWE Live event on May 15 proved to be Banks' final WWE match, as during the May 16 episode of Raw, Banks and Naomi reportedly walked out on WWE due to a creative dispute with Vince McMahon. WWE released an official statement claiming that the two "walked into WWE Head of Talent Relations John Laurinaitis' office with their suitcases in hand, placed their tag team championship belts on his desk and walked out". The two were originally booked for the show's main event, which had to be reworked. On the following episode of SmackDown, it was announced that Banks and Naomi had been suspended indefinitely, therefore vacating the titles. In December 2022, it was reported that negotiations over compensation had fallen through during the summer and that Banks was done with WWE.

New Japan Pro-Wrestling and Stardom (2023–present)
After months of speculation, Varnado made her debut appearance for New Japan Pro-Wrestling (NJPW) on January 4, 2023, at Wrestle Kingdom 17. Now going by the ring name Mercedes Moné, she confronted and later attacked reigning IWGP Women's Champion Kairi and announced that she had joined both NJPW and its sister promotion World Wonder Ring Stardom. This led to a title match between the two at Battle in the Valley on February 18, in which Moné defeated Kairi to win the title.

Other media

Video games
As Sasha Banks, she made her video game debut in WWE 2K17, and has since appeared in WWE 2K18, WWE 2K19, WWE 2K20, and WWE 2K22. She also appears in the mobile games WWE SuperCard and WWE Mayhem, as well as the spin-off game WWE 2K Battlegrounds.

Television
Varnado made her acting debut in the second season (2020) of the Disney+ series The Mandalorian, where she portrays Koska Reeves, a Mandalorian who serves under Bo-Katan Kryze as a member of the Nite Owls. In her final appearance as Sasha Banks, she was a celebrity contestant on an episode of the USA Network game show Barmageddon, which aired on January 2, 2023. The episode was filmed before her departure from WWE.

Music
"Song for Sasha Banks", written and performed by The Mountain Goats, tells the story of her childhood, watching Chris Jericho on SmackDown, and then becoming a professional wrestler in her own right. It was released as a single digital track on June 18, 2018.

Others 
Varnado, as Sasha Banks, served as honorary starter for the 2021 Daytona 500. In September 2022, Varnado made her modeling debut at New York Fashion Week alongside Naomi.

Filmography

Personal life 

Through her father, Kaestner-Varnado is a first cousin of rapper Snoop Dogg, who helped develop her in-ring persona. She is also a first cousin of music producer Daz Dillinger and singers Brandy Norwood and Ray J. She is a fan of K-pop music and the Japanese anime Sailor Moon.

Kaestner-Varnado has cited Eddie Guerrero as her favorite wrestler and inspiration. She was in attendance at Guerrero's memorial episode of Raw on November 14, 2005, in Minneapolis, and she also revealed that she was unaware that Guerrero had died before she arrived at the arena.

On August 4, 2016, Kaestner-Varnado married retired professional wrestler Sarath Ton. The two met while they were both wrestling on the independent circuit. Ton, who is widely known by his ring name Mikaze, now works as a costume designer for WWE.

Championships and accomplishments 

 CBS Sports
 Tag Team of the Year (2020) – 
 Chaotic Wrestling
 Chaotic Wrestling Women's Championship (1 time)
 ESPY Awards
 Best WWE Moment (2021) 
 Independent Wrestling Entertainment
 IWE Women's Championship (1 time)
 New Japan Pro-Wrestling
 IWGP Women's Championship (1 time, current)
 Pro Wrestling Illustrated
 Match of the Year (2015) 
 Woman of the Year (2015)
 Feud of the Year (2016) 
 Feud of the Year (2020) 
 Tag Team of the Year (2020) – 
 Ranked No. 2 of the top 50 female wrestlers in the PWI Female 50 in 2016
 Ranked No. 3 of the top 50 tag teams in the PWI Tag Team 50 in 2020 – 
 Ring Wars Carolina
 RWC No Limitz Championship (1 time)
 Rolling Stone
 Future Diva of the Year (2015)
 Ranked No. 4 of the 10 best WWE wrestlers of 2016
 NXT Match of the Year (2015) 
 Title Feud of the Year, NXT (2015) 
 Sirius XM Busted Open Radio
 Wrestler of the Year (2020)
 Tag Team of the Year (2020) – 
 Sports Illustrated
 Ranked No. 8 of the top 10 female wrestlers in 2019 – 
 Wrestler of the Year (2020)
 Wrestling Observer Newsletter
 Worst Feud of the Year (2015) Team PCB vs. Team B.A.D. vs. Team Bella
 Worst Feud of the Year (2018) vs. Bayley
 WWE
 NXT Women's Championship (1 time)
 WWE Raw Women's Championship (5 times)
 WWE SmackDown Women's Championship (1 time)
 WWE Women's Tag Team Championship (3 times) – with Bayley (2), and Naomi (1)
 Fourth WWE Women's Triple Crown Champion
 Third WWE Women's Grand Slam Champion
 NXT Year-End Award (1 time)
 Match of the Year (2015) 
 Slammy Award (2 times)
 Female Superstar of the Year (2020)
 Double-Cross of the Year (2020) – Bayley attacks Sasha Banks on SmackDown (September 4)
 Bumpy Award (1 time)
 Tag Team of the Half-Year (2020) – with Bayley
 Best Match of the Half-Year (2021) –

Awards and nominations

Notes

References

External links 

 
 
 
 

1992 births
Living people
People from Fairfield, California
American female professional wrestlers
Professional wrestlers from California
Professional wrestling managers and valets
Professional wrestlers from Massachusetts
American people of German descent
21st-century American actresses
Actresses from the San Francisco Bay Area
Actresses from Boston
Sportspeople from Boston
American television actresses
African-American female professional wrestlers
IWGP Women's Champions
WWE Grand Slam champions
NXT Women's Champions
21st-century African-American women
21st-century professional wrestlers
WWE Raw Women's Champions
WWE SmackDown Women's Champions
WWE Women's Tag Team Champions